Rockmont is an unincorporated community located in the town of Amnicon, Douglas County, Wisconsin, United States.

History
A post office called Rockmont was established in 1897, and remained in operation until it was discontinued in 1911. The community took its name from a rocky mound nearby.

Notes

Unincorporated communities in Douglas County, Wisconsin
Unincorporated communities in Wisconsin